Greater Portmore High School (G.P.H.S) is a government high school located in Portmore, Saint Catherine, Jamaica  and founded in 1995. The school excels in rugby as four-time champions of SBR (School Boy Rugby) as well as Altogether Sing.

Notable alumni
 I Wayne, reggae singer
 Leford Green, Olympian Errol Stevens, Jermaul Adair, Tyrone Lewis, Hurvin Clarke, Monique Davis, Mark Wint

References

External links
Greater Portmore High School at Jamaica Yellow Pages

Buildings and structures in Saint Catherine Parish
Educational institutions established in 1995
High schools in Jamaica
1995 establishments in Jamaica